Konstantinos Kormaris (born 29 June 1973) is a retired Greek football striker.

References

1973 births
Living people
Greek footballers
Kastoria F.C. players
PAS Giannina F.C. players
Iraklis Thessaloniki F.C. players
A.O. Kerkyra players
Olympiacos Volos F.C. players
Agrotikos Asteras F.C. players
Anagennisi Epanomi F.C. players
Super League Greece players
Association football forwards
Footballers from Kastoria